Goodland is an unincorporated community in western Iron County, Missouri, United States. It is located on a county road, approximately two miles from Route 49 in the Mark Twain National Forest.

History
A post office called Goodland was established in 1882, and remained in operation until 1966. The community was named for the quality of their land.

References

Unincorporated communities in Iron County, Missouri
Unincorporated communities in Missouri